Francisco Ruben Osorio Gary (born November 15, 1975 in Barranquilla) is a welterweight boxer from Colombia, who won the bronze medal at the 1995 Pan American Games in Mar del Plata, Argentina. Nicknamed Flash he made his professional debut on March 21, 1997, when he was defeated by countryman Roberto Ortega.

References
 

1975 births
Living people
Welterweight boxers
Boxers at the 1995 Pan American Games
Sportspeople from Barranquilla
Colombian male boxers
Pan American Games bronze medalists for Colombia
Pan American Games medalists in boxing
Medalists at the 1995 Pan American Games
20th-century Colombian people
21st-century Colombian people